Dharmayuddhaya is a 2017 Sri Lankan Sinhala-language crime thriller film directed by Cheyyar Ravi and produced by MTV Channel and The Capital Maharaja Organization Limited, and distributed by M Entertainments. It is a shot-for-shot remake of the Indian Malayalam-language film Drishyam (2013) starring Mohanlal by Jeethu Joseph. The film stars Jackson Anthony and Dilhani Ekanayake in the lead roles and features Kusum Renu, Kumara Thirimadura, Thisuri Yuwanika and Roshan Pilapitiya in supporting roles. The music was composed by Sachith Peris.

It is the 1282nd Sri Lankan film in the Sinhala cinema. The official trailer was released on 30 January 2017. The premiere of the movie was held on 13 July 2017 at Regal Cinema where the director, Cheyyar Ravi, had died in March 2017 before the release. The film successfully passed 100 days run in theatres.

Plot

Harishchandra, an orphan, who had dropped out of school after 4th grade, now is a businessman running a real estate center in Manudampura. He is married to a woman named Rani and they have two daughters, Achini and Sachini. His only interest apart from his family is watching films and he spends most of his time in front of the TV in his small office.

During a nature camp, Achini gets recorded in the bathroom by a hidden cell phone which belongs to a young boy named Shane, the spoiled son of MP Vishaka Samaranayake. Shane blackmails Achini to open store room door while he come at late night, or else he would put the video on social media that would humiliate her. When Rani finds out about this and confronts Shane for it, Shane retaliates by demanding Rani sleep with him instead of Achini. Enraged by this, Achini hits on Shane's head with a pipe and broke the cell phone, killing him instantly. Horrified of what happened to Shane, Rani and Achini hide his body in a compost pit, which is witnessed by Sachini. Rani tells about the incident to Harishchandra, who devises a way to save his family from the law. He removes the broken cell phone and drives the Shane's car, which is seen by Harischandra's rival, Constable Vimal. Then, Harischandra drowns Shane's car into the river. This murder actually happened on August 2. To ensure things go smooth, Harischandra takes his family out on August 4,5 to a Meditation program which actually held on Matale August 2, watch a movie and eat at a restaurant. Upon seeing that Shane has gone missing, Vishaka starts an investigation.

After Vimal revealed that Shane's car which driven by Harishchandra, had found in a river, Vishaka calls Harishchandra and family for questioning. Predicting that this would happen, Harishchandra had already taught his family how to change their alibi at the time of murder. When questioned individually, they give the same replies, surprising Vishaka. Harishchandra also presents the bill of the restaurant, the movie tickets and the bus tickets as proof of their alibi. Vishaka questions the owners of the establishments they claim they have been to, and their statements prove Harishchandra's alibi. However, after contacting Thero who held meditation program on Matale, Vishaka learns that some DVDs had released about that program. Then, She realizes that, Harishchandra had faked the evidence and established his alibi on the owners by going on a trip with his family to the same establishments later; some time after the murder, Harishchandra had met the owners again, and during the meetings, he had cleverly plotted in their minds that they had visited Matale on August 2,3.

With that in mind, Vishaka arrests Harishchandra with his family, and Vimal uses brute force to beat the truth out of them. Eventually, Sachini gives in after being brutally beaten by Vimal and reveals the place where the body is buried. However, Vishaka and her husband soon learned from Shane's friend, Damith that Shane took pictures of Achini on his phone, realizing that they raised a perverted teenager who tried to rape a young girl. After digging the compost pit, they only find the carcass of a calf, as Harishchandra anticipated that they would find the location by moving Shane's body elsewhere. With no evidence to prove that Harishchandra and his family have murdered Shane, Harishchandra gets Sachini to publicly speak out against Vimal for beating her, resulting several citizens to chase and beat up Vimal, who then gets suspended for battery and assault. All charges against Harishchandra and his family are dropped, and Vishaka resigns from her post, presumably out of guilt over Shane's actions.

Later on, Vishaka and her husband apologize to Harishchandra and his family for their rude and violent behavior, holding themselves responsible for spoiling Shane in the first place and pleading to know what happened to him. A remorseful Harishchandra finally confesses that his family accidentally killed Shane because of what Shane tried to do to Achini. Harishchandra signs a register at the newly constructed local police station, where the new Inspector states that Harishchandra won't be fooling him and the police, to which Harishchandra replies that the police are only there to protect citizens like him, and that he has no intention of fooling them any further. As he leaves, a flashback shows him leaving the incomplete police station with a shovel in hand. The earlier dialogue and the flashback both subtly imply that he has hidden Shane's body in the foundations of the police station itself because no one would think to look there.

Cast
 Jackson Anthony as Harischandra – A businessman who runs an estate center
 Dilhani Ekanayake as Rani Harischandra – Harischandra's wife
 Kusum Renu as PM Vishaka Samaranayake – Parliament member and lawyer, Shane's mother
 Roshan Pilapitiya as OIC Ravi – OIC of Manudampura Police 
 Kumara Thirimadura as PC Vimal – Former inspector of Manudampura Police
 Thisuri Yuwanika as Achini Harischandra – Harischandra and Rani's elder daughter
 Vinumi Vansadhi as Sachini Harischandra – Harischandra and Rani's younger daughter
 Dhanuka Dilshan as Shane Samaranayake – Vishaka and Upali's son
 Rohan Jayakody as Restaurant Cashier
 Ananda Atukorala as Sargent Jinadasa – Sargent of Manudampura Police
 Douglas Ranasinghe as Upali Samaranayake – Vishaka's husband and Shane's father
 Avanthi Aponsu as Rani's mother
 Wasantha Kumarasiri as Rani's father
 Ariyasena Gamage as Mudalali – Owner of Tea shop
 Tharanga Bandara as Rani's brother
 Mahinda Jinasena as Nihal – Contractor of New Police building
 Samantha Kumara Gamage as Film projector operator
 Sarath Rupasinghe as Rest House manager
 Somasiri Colambage as Siripala
 Nirukshan Ekanayake as Palitha – Harischandra's secretary
 Suresh Chandra as CTB Bus Conductor
 Damith Rukshan as Gamini 
 Sureni Senarath as Principal
 Manjula Dissanayake as Damith – Shane's friend
 Sisira Thadikara as OIC – OIC of New Police building
 Madhusanka Bandara as Saman Witharana – Sargent of New Police building

Songs

Origins

Besides Dharmayuddhaya, Drishyam has been remade in several languages. All the versions were commercially successful.

Reception

Box office
The film earned 535 Lakhs (53.5 million) of Sri Lankan rupees from 31 days of screening. The CEL theatre corporation revealed that the film has been watched by more than 235,000 viewers, by the end of first month. The film earned 955 SLR Lakhs (95.5 million)from 45 days, a record box office in Sri Lankan cinema. After 65 days of screening, the film had been watched by over 700,000 viewers, according to CEL theatres. After 100 days of screening, the film earned 22.4 SL crores (224 million).Dharmayuddhaya is the second highest-grossing film in Sri Lanka.

Accolades
Top performer of the respective cinema circuit as well as over 10 cinemas in the country, ‘Dharmayuddhaya's accolades includes -

References

External links 

ධර්මයුද්ධය තිරයට පැමිණි දා
ළමයින් මා අමතන්නේ නෝටි ආන්ටි නමින්
Winners of the Sixth Derana Sunsilk Film Awards 2018

2017 films
Shot-for-shot remakes
2010s Sinhala-language films
Remakes of Indian films